

Before 1 September 1939

1 September 1939–1969

See also
 List of unsolved murders in the United Kingdom
 Chris Clark, author and documentary-maker who focuses on unsolved murders
 David Smith, convicted killer suspected of being responsible for unsolved murders

References

Lists of victims of crimes
United Kingdom crime-related lists
Before 1970